Chrysoritis rileyi, the Riley's opal, is a species of butterfly in the family Lycaenidae. It is endemic to South Africa, where it is known only from hill slopes and river flats at the east end of the Brandvlei Dam in the Western Cape.

Adults are on wing from September to April, with peaks from October to November and in March.

The larvae feed on Thesium and Zygophyllum species. They are attended to by Crematogaster peringueyi ants.

References

Butterflies described in 1966
Chrysoritis
Endemic butterflies of South Africa
Taxonomy articles created by Polbot